Ti Saddhya Kay Karte is a 2017 Marathi language romantic drama film which is produced by Zee Studios and directed by Satish Rajwade. It stars Ankush Chaudhari and Tejashree Pradhan in lead roles. Abhinay Berde, son of actor Lakshmikant Berde, and Aarya Ambekar play younger versions of characters played by Ankush and Tejashree. The movie had its theatrical release on 6 January 2017.

Ti Saddhya Kay Karte's trailer is attached with Aamir Khan's Dangal will be released in cinemas in Maharashtra.

Plot
Now grown up, middle aged, Anurag wonders about his first love Tanvi, whom he hasn't seen in years. He wants to confess his love for her, in college. But they have a small quarrel where he yells at her. She moves to Delhi and then to Boston. They marry different people. He names his daughter after her. She comes to visit him after many years. They meet and he apologizes for his behaviour in college. They part after making a promise to stay friends and in touch.

Cast

 Ankush Chaudhari as Anurag (Anya)
 Abhinay Berde as young Anurag (Anya)
 Hruditya Rajwade as kid Anurag (Anya)
 Tejashri Pradhan as Tanvi
 Aarya Ambekar as young Tanvi
 Nirmohi Agnihotri as kid Tanvi
 Urmila Kanitkar as Radhika 
 Prasad Barve as Pavya
 Sanjay Mone as Anurag's Father
 Sukanya Kulkarni- Mone as Anurag's mother
 Tushar Dalvi as Tanvi's father 
 Anuradha Rajadhyaksha as Tanvi's mother 
 Isha Phadke as Mohini
 Nitesh Kalbande as young Pavya
 Rajas Bakshi as

Release

Ti Saddhya Kay Karte released on 6 January 2017 with English subtitles in Maharashtra, Gujarat, Goa, Madhya Pradesh, Delhi, Karnataka, Andhra Pradesh and Telangana.

Box office
The film has grossed around  within 14 days and surpassed  mark within 3 weeks. The film ended up grossing  at the box office.

Soundtrack

The songs for the film were composed by various artists like Nilesh Moharir, Avinash-Vishwajeet and Mandar Aapte.

See also
 Highest grossing Marathi films
 List of most expensive Indian films

References

External links 
 

2017 films
Indian romantic drama films
2010s Marathi-language films
2017 romantic drama films
Films directed by Satish Rajwade